"Coastline" is a song by producer Steve Kroeger and singer Skye Holland. It became their third collaboration to chart on the Dance/Mix Show Airplay chart. A remixes EP was released on 7 April 2017, featuring remixes from Rick Ellback & Van Dutch and Tale & Dutch.

Track listing

Charts

References 

2017 songs
2017 singles
Electronic songs